Lamprias (Greek: Λαμπρίας) was the grandfather of the Greek biographer and philosoper Plutarch.  He appears as a character in several of Plutarch's works, notably the "Table Talks"  He's also mentioned in Plutarch's Life of Antony as a friend of Philotas, one of Mark Antony's court physicians and a witness for some of the stories Plutarch relates about Antony and Cleopatra. Elsewhere Plutarch quotes him making ironic observations about Jewish dietary laws.

According to Plutarch, Lamprias was a man of eloquence and imagination. Very little is known of his life apart from what can be gleaned from Plutarch's writing. although he probably lived in Chaeronea of Boeotia, in Central Greece.

References

External links
 Dictionary of Greek and Roman Biography and Mythology v. 2, page 715

1st-century Greek people
Ancient Boeotians